is the tenth studio album by Japanese artist Masaharu Fukuyama. It was released on 30 June 2009. It reached the number 1 spot on the Oricon chart with sales of 260,917.

Track listing
All lyrics and music by Masaharu Fukuyama. Arranged by Masaharu Fukuyama and Akira Inoue, except "Tokyo ni mo Attanda" by Masaharu Fukuyama and Takayuki Hattori.

 

18 (Eighteen)

Phantom
Survivor

99

Charts and sales

Oricon sales charts (Japan)

References

2009 albums
Masaharu Fukuyama albums